The acronym NCCT may mean:

 The National Committee for Counter Trafficking, a National Committee in Cambodia
 Non-Cooperative Countries or Territories, designated by the FATF
 "Na-Cl co-transporter", or sodium-chloride symporter
 National Center for Competency Testing, an American certification organization
 National Center for Computational Toxicology, office under United States Environmental Protection Agency
 Network-Centric Collaborative Targeting, a military collaboration program by L3 Communications 
 Non-contrast computed tomography
 NISSAN Cyclic Corrosion Test